The Sovereign Internet Law is the informal name for a set of 2019 amendments to existing Russian legislation that mandate Internet surveillance and grants the Russian government powers to partition Russia from the rest of the Internet, including the creation of a national fork of the Domain Name System.

In a statement released by the State Legal Department on March 13, 2019, the federal law was aimed at "suppressing the dissemination of unreliable socially significant information under the guise of reliable messages that creates a threat of harm to the life and (or) health of citizens, property, a threat of massive disruption of public order and (or) public safety, or a threat of interfering with the functioning or termination of the functioning of facilities life support, transport or social infrastructure, credit institutions, energy facilities, industry and communications."

References

See also 
 Internet censorship in Russia
 Mass surveillance in Russia
 Internet balkanization
 Alternative DNS root
 Yarovaya’s Law

2019 in law
2019 in Russia
Law of Russia
Censorship in Russia
Internet law
Internet access
Internet censorship in Russia